The Burning of the Red Lotus Temple  is a lost Chinese silent film serial directed by Zhang Shichuan, widely considered to be the founding father of Chinese cinema. The film is adapted from the novel The Tale of the Extraordinary Swordsman.

The Burning of the Red Lotus Temple, in 16 parts, is among the longest films ever produced and the longest major release, running 27 hours in total. The Mingxing Film Company production was released in 19 feature-length parts between 1928 and 1931. No copies have survived. The craze of the film series eventually led the Kuomintang to ban all wuxia films by the early 1930s because wuxia was thought to be inciting anarchy and rebellion.

See also
List of lost films
List of longest films

References

External links 
 

1928 films
1929 films
1930 films
1931 films
Chinese silent films
Lost Chinese films
Film serials
Wuxia films
Films directed by Zhang Shichuan
Chinese black-and-white films
Chinese drama films
1928 lost films
1929 lost films
1930 lost films
1931 lost films
Lost drama films
Silent drama films